WRKB may refer to:

 WRKB, a radio station licensed to Kannapolis, North Carolina, USA
 WRFX, a radio station licensed to Kannapolis, North Carolina which used the call sign WRKB-FM between 1964 and 1982
 Pahdamaleda Airport, in Indonesia